Ocean Avenue Acoustic is an acoustic reinterpretation by Yellowcard of their fourth album, Ocean Avenue (2003).

Production
Sessions for Ocean Avenue Acoustic were held at Robert Berson Studios, Eli's Place, and Room 219 at The Inn at Renown Regional Medical Center. It was produced by Ryan Key and Erich Talaba, who also handled recording and mixing. The album was mastered by Paul Leavitt.

Release and reception

On May 3, 2013, the group responded to rumours in regards to an acoustic version of Ocean Avenue, stating "[W]e had a better plan to tell you, but its true". They also said that further information would follow. On June 3, the band formally announced the release of Ocean Avenue Acoustic, a record that contained acoustic versions of songs that appeared on Ocean Avenue. A trailer for the album was posted online later in the day. On July 23, the title-track was released as a single. Ocean Avenue Acoustic was made available for streaming via YouTube on August 6, before being released on August 13 through Hopeless Records.

Following a series of festival shows, the band embarked on headlining US and Australian tours in September and October. These tours, which were supported by Geoff Rickly of Thursday, featured Ocean Avenue performed in its entirety acoustically, followed by an electric set of songs from their other records. Proceeding this, the group went on Warped Tour in Europe in November. In January and February 2014, the band went on a second leg of the Ocean Avenue Acoustic tour in the US, with support from What's Eating Gilbert.

The album received a Metacritic score of 60 based on 5 reviews, indicating mixed or average reviews. The album debuted at No. 53 on Billboard 200, with 7,000 copies sold, 4,000 of which are downloads.  It also debuted at No. 11 on both the Rock Albums and Independent Albums charts.

Track listing
All lyrics by Ryan Key, all music by Yellowcard.

Personnel
Personnel per booklet.

Yellowcard
 Ryan Key – lead vocals, guitar
 Sean Mackin – violin, backing vocals, string arrangements
 Ryan Mendez – guitar
 Longineu W. Parsons III – drums

Additional musicians
 Neal Avron – string arrangemtns
 C.J. Vanston – piano (track 12)
 Rodney Wirtz – viola
 Christina Lightner – cello
 Tiffany Villarreal – additional vocals (track 9)

Production and design
 Ryan Key – producer
 Erich Talaba – producer, recording, mixing
 Paul Leavitt – mastering
 Joshua Stern – photography
 Brian Manley – artwork, design

Charts

References

Yellowcard albums
2013 albums
Hopeless Records albums